Sovetskaya is a rural locality (a stanitsa) and the administrative centre of Sovetsky District, Rostov Oblast, Russia. Population: 

Until 1957 it was named Chernyshevskaya.

References

Notes

Sources

Rural localities in Rostov Oblast
Don Host Oblast